An equivalent of presidential election was held in the Romanian People's Republic on 21 March 1961.

The name of the Presidium of the Great National Assembly (Romania's Communist parliament) is changed into State Council of Romania and Gheorghe Gheorghiu-Dej features the president of the new institution, thus becoming the first president of the State Council, de facto head of state. This change was enforced as the Law #1/1961 and voted by the Great National Assembly.

Candidate

References

President of the State Council election
1961 elections in Romania 
Presidential elections in Romania